Steven Kemenyffy (born 1943) is an American ceramic artist living and working in Pennsylvania. He is most recognized for his contributions to the development of the American ceramic raku tradition. Beginning in 1969, he served as a Professor of Ceramic Art at Edinboro University of Pennsylvania (formerly Edinboro State College). He retired from teaching after forty years, but continues to produce artwork at his home studio in McKean, Pennsylvania.

Biography 

Steven Kemenyffy was born in Budapest, Hungary in 1943 in the midst of World War II. His father was serving in the war effort during his birth, and Kemenyffy and his mother would not be reunited with his father until 1949. During the interim, Kemmenyffy and his mother lived with an aunt, Margit Gosztonyi, who worked as a potter in Baden-Baden, Germany. Kemenyffy's family immigrated to the United States as displaced citizens, under the sponsorship of a Presbyterian Church in Rock Island, Illinois in 1951. In the United States, Kemenyffy's mother served as a seamstress and his father worked as an engineer with a surveying company. Kemenyffy lived in Rock Island until 1964, having earned a bachelor's of science in mathematics at the nearby Augustana College (Illinois).

Kemenyffy's interest in becoming a ceramic artist began shortly after college when he attended a Peter Voulkos workshop. He then began ceramic studies at the University of Iowa where he met his wife and artistic collaborator, Susan Hale Kemenyffy. In 1967, Steven received a Master of Fine Arts in ceramics, and Susan received an MFA in printmaking. They were married in 1970. After receiving his MFA, Steven taught at multiple institutions, including the University of Wisconsin-Whitewater, School of the Art Institute of Chicago, University of Colorado at Boulder, Penland School of Crafts, and Haystack Mountain School of Crafts. Kemenyffy began teaching at Edinboro University of Pennsylvania in 1969, until his retirement in 2009.

Work 

Kemenyffy is often characterized in regard to his contributions to American experimental ceramics of the late 1960s and early 1970s. More specifically, Kemenyffy's contributions to American raku techniques are often cited. Kemenyffy has stated that his interest in raku came out of practical considerations, as he and Susan: "... were doing a variety of workshops in a variety of different media. Raku was always an official way of making pieces in a short period of time…In raku it seems to compress all the firings into one."

Kemenyffy, himself, describes his early work as "Biomorphic forms alluding to old ceramic traditions such as tiles, vases, and containers." These works were often in excess of six feet tall and many times included mixed media elements. In 1974, Kemenyffy wrote about the work he was producing; "For several years now, my work has dealt with certain formal considerations. Chief among these is using clay in such a way as to crystallize the moment and permanentize the impermanent. These have been among the primary concerns of all potters since the earliest times." Today, Kemenyffy continues his pursuit of biomorphic imagery and themes. He writes, "Personally I am most challenged by the business of transforming porous organics into porcelain."

For much of Kemenyffy's career, he has worked in tandem with his wife, Susan Hale Kemenyffy. In 1987 Susan stated about their collaborative works: "Steven is the [sculptor], I am the drawer. These works would not exist if it weren't for the sculpture; if it weren't for the clay. The clay entity comes first and my drawings come second." James Paul Thompson further clarifies this relationship (as observed in 1987): "Steven Kemenyffy uses patterns as a point of departure for his work, while Susan Kemenyffy allows the people and things around her to become partial inspiration in addition to what Steven gives her."

Selected collections 

Kemenyffy is included in over 100 collections worldwide, including:
– The International Museum. Kacskemet, Hungary.
– The Carnegie Museum of Art. Pittsburgh, PA.
– The Renwick Gallery of the Smithsonian Institution. Washington, DC.
– Everson Museum of Art. Syracuse, NY.
– Cincinnati Art Museum. Cincinnati, OH.
– The Museum of Contemporary Crafts. New York, NY.
– The Cleveland Museum of Art. Cleveland, OH.
– Zanesville Museum of Art, Zanesville, OH

Selected exhibitions 

Kemenyffy has participated in over three hundred exhibitions worldwide, including: 
– 1997. "Keramia Fesztival." Vigado Museum. Budapest, Hungary.
– 1997. "Nemzetkozi Szimpozium." Tolgyfa Galeria. Budapest, Hungary.
– 1995. "4th International Ceramics Competition." Mino, Japan.
– 1983. "Soup, Soup, Beautiful Soup." Campbell Museum. Camden, NJ.
– 1980. "Contemporary Americans." Contemporary Artisans. San Francisco, CA.
– 1974. "Cup and Plate Invitational." Helen Drutt Gallery. Philadelphia, PA.
– 1974. "Baroque." Museum of Contemporary Crafts. New York, NY.
– 1973. "This Plastic Earth." John Michael Kohler Art Center. Sheboygan, WI.
– 1973. "Ceramics International." Calgary, CA. Award: 2nd Place World Prize.
– 1972. "Salt-Glazed Ceramics." Museum of Contemporary Crafts. New York, NY.
– 1972. "The Cleveland May Show." Cleveland Museum of Art. Cleveland, OH. Award: Best in Show.
– 1972. Objects: USA Traveling Exhibition. Opened in Smithsonian Institution. Washington, DC.

Selected lectures and workshops 

Kemenyffy has presented over two hundred workshops and lectures in his career, including: 
– 1991. Renwick Gallery of the Smithsonian Institution. Washington, DC.
– 1989. Lucia Bittencourt Studio. São Paulo, Brazil. 
– 1988. National Ceramics. Wellington, New Zealand. 
– 1987. International Ceramic Studio. Kecskemet, Hungary.
– 1985. Edinburgh College of Art. Edinburgh, Scotland.
– 1985. University of Leeds. West Yorkshire, England.
– 1985. NCECA Panel Leader, "Clay and the Nature of Limits."

Sources 

Associated Artists of Pittsburgh, and Carnegie Mellon University. Seventy-Five Years of Pittsburgh Art, Its Influences. [Pittsburgh]: AAP, 1985.

Branfman, Steven. Raku A Practical Approach. Radnor, Pa: Chilton Book Co, 1991.

Campbell Museum. Soup, Soup, Beautiful Soup An Exhibition of Contemporary Soup Tureens. Camden, N.J.: Campbell Museum, 1984.

Caruso, Nino. Ceramica raku manuale pratico di un'antica tecnica giapponese rinnovata e reinventata in Occidente. Milano: U. Hoepli, 1982.

Craig, Stephanie. "Diversity, Community, Synergy: A Review of Edinboro Ceramics." Ceramics Monthly, v. 53 no. 9, 2005.

Donhauser, Paul S. History of American Ceramics: The Studio Potter. Dubuque, Iowa: Kendall/Hunt Pub. Co, 1978.

Gibson, John. Contemporary Pottery Decoration. Radnor, PA: Chilton, 1987.

Kenny, John B. The Complete Book of Pottery Making. Radnor, Pa: Chilton Book Co, 1976.

Moore College of Art Gallery. Clay Things: East Coast Invitational. Philadelphia: Moore College, 1974.

Nigrosh, Leon I. Low Fire Other Ways to Work in Clay. Worcester, Mass: Davis Publications, 1980.

Nigrosh, Leon I. Sculpting Clay. Worcester, Mass: Davis Publications, 1992.

Nordness, Lee. Objects: USA. New York: Viking Press, 1970.

Peterson, Susan. The Craft and Art of Clay. Englewood Cliffs, NJ: Prentice Hall, 1992.

Piepenburg, Robert E. Raku Pottery. New York: Macmillan, 1972.

Rossiter, Sarah. "The Quest for the Glowing Glaze." Ceramics Monthly, v. 52 no. 6, 2004.

Scott, Paul. Painted Clay Graphic Arts and the Ceramic Surface. New York: Watson-Guptill Publications, 2001.

Speight, Charlotte F. Hands in Clay An Introduction to Ceramics. Mountain View, Calif: Mayfield, 1989.

Thompson, James Paul. "Raku: Sixteenth Century Japan/Twentieth Century America." Ed.D diss., Illinois State University, 1987.

Tyler, Christopher, and Richard Hirsch. Raku. New York: Watson-Guptill Publications, 1975.

Zakin, Richard. Ceramics: Mastering the Craft. Iola, WI: Krause Publications, 2001.

References 

Living people
1943 births
American ceramists
University of Wisconsin–Whitewater faculty
School of the Art Institute of Chicago faculty
Hungarian emigrants to the United States
Augustana College (Illinois) alumni
University of Iowa alumni
University of Colorado Boulder faculty
Penland School of Crafts faculty
20th-century ceramists
21st-century ceramists